The Xiaomi Mi 11 is an Android-based high-end smartphone designed, developed, produced, and marketed by Xiaomi Inc. succeeding their Xiaomi Mi 10 series. The phone was launched globally on February 8, 2021.

Hardware

Design 
The design of the Xiaomi Mi 11 is similar to that of the Mi 10, maintaining the front camera design in the upper left corner. The Mi 11 uses Corning Gorilla Glass Victus on its display and Corning Gorilla Glass 5, or vegan leather, on its back. The front of the phone uses a hidden earpiece. The back of the phone has two material designs and five available colours: black, white, blue, smokey purple, and brown. The first three use anti-glare glass and the latter two use vegan leather. Due to the varying materials, the thickness and weight of the device are also different. The anti-glare frosted glass version is 8.06 mm thick and weighs 196 g, and the vegan leather version is 8.56 mm thick and weighs 194 g.

The side frame of the Mi 11 is made of an aluminum alloy, and there is a communication antenna overflow band around the fuselage, which is filled with plastic injection molding with a colour similar to the frame. The upper part of the frame is equipped with a noise-reduction microphone, an infrared emission window, and a top sub-speaker (integrated earpiece function). The right side is equipped with plus and minus volume buttons and a switch screen/power button. The lower part is equipped with a SIM card slot and ejection jack, a USB Type-C interface, and the main speaker openings. There is no opening on the left side. The frame becomes wider near the control buttons.

The back of the Mi 11 is made of AG-processed glass or leather-like polycarbonate plastic. The glass-based version of the back cover is about 2 g heavier than the polycarbonate version, but the total thickness is reduced by 0.5mm. The upper left corner of the back cover contains the rear camera group area, which is contained in a rounded rectangle. The left side of the camera area is a Nascar racetrack-shaped black area, with the main camera sensor placed on the upper part and the wide-angle sensor on the lower part. There is a bright silver ring on the periphery of the main camera sensor opening, which is slightly protruding and echoes the design of Mi 9, Mi CC9 and other models. The right side of the racetrack-shaped area is a silver area, from top to bottom, the long-focus macro sensor, LED fill light and auxiliary ambient light sensor are arranged. In the lower-left corner of the fuselage, the "XIAOMI" logo of the Xiaomi Group, which is the same as the Xiaomi CC9 series, replaces the previous "MI" logo. The plain leather version also has a metal circular decoration under the logo, which also serves as a fixed leather laminate.

Screen 
The Xiaomi Mi 11 uses a  flexible AMOLED display provided by Samsung Display, which is Samsung's fourth-generation AMOLED substrate (E4). It has a diamond-shaped sub-pixel arrangement and has a resolution of 3200 by 1440. The pixel density (PPI) is 515. It supports up to 1771nit of peak brightness and 996nit of full-screen brightness, as tested by Display Mate, and supports DCI-P3 color gamut.

The screen glass of Xiaomi Mi 11 uses Corning Gorilla Glass Victus. According to Xiaomi, the drop resistance is 1.5 times that of the previous generation, and the scratch resistance is twice that of the previous generation.

Chip and Storage 
Mi 11 used the first model of Qualcomm Snapdragon 888 SoC.

The part code of the Qualcomm Snapdragon 888 is SM8350, and the CPU part has Qualcomm Kryo 680 architecture. It consists of a large core with a main frequency of 2.84 GHz, three middle cores with a main frequency of 2.42 GHz, and four small cores of 1.8 GHz. The chip integrates an Adreno 660 GPU with a main frequency of 840 MHz It supports dual 5G SIM cards while staying on standby under the 5G network.

In terms of storage, the Xiaomi Mi 11 encapsulates 8GB or 12GB of LPDDR5 RAM above the SoC, with a main frequency of 3200 MHz, and optional storage of 128GB or 256GB. The specifications are all UFS 3.1, which is consistent with the Mi 10 Extreme Commemorative Edition.

Camera 

For the rear camera, the Mi 11 uses the Samsung Bright S5KHMX sensor that was used in the Mi 10, Mi 10 Pro, Mi CC9 Pro, and other models, with 108 million pixels and an aperture value of f/1.85. In addition to acting as the main camera in the Mi 11, it also supports up to 30 times digital zoom through cropping. By default, Mi 11 output photo pixels are the same as Mi 10, with 27 million pixels (pixel-binned 108-megapixel images). It can record video at 720P 30fps, 1080P 30/60fps, 4K 30/60fps, and AI 8K 24/30fps. In addition to normal video, it can also record interpolated slow-motion at 720P 120/480fps and 1080P 120/480fps.

The Xiaomi Mi 11 is also equipped with a 13-megapixel ultra-wide-angle sensor (supplied by Omnivision Technologies, OV13B10), which supports wide-angle shooting up to 123°, an aperture of f/2.4, and can record video at 720P 30fps, 1080P 30/60fps, and 4K 30fps.

The device also sports a 5-megapixel telephoto macro camera (supplied by Samsung, S5K5E9) which has a focusing range of 10-3cm from the subject. This sensor is also able to record video at 720P 30fps and 1080P 30fps.

The front camera of the Mi 11 uses the Samsung S5K3T2 sensor, which is also used in the Xiaomi Mi 10 series and Redmi K20/30 series, with a pixel count of 20 million. It supports 1080P 30/60fps and 720P 30fps video recording.

Other 
The Mi 11 supports wired charging with a power of up to 55W (11V 5A MAX), wireless charging with a power of 50W, and reverse wireless charging with a power of up to 10W, which can charge other devices that support wireless charging. However, the Chinese version of the Mi 11 does not come with a charger. In certain regions, the standard version arrives with no charger, but a version with a 55 W GaN charger is also available at no extra cost. The global version comes with a 55W GaN charger, charging cable, plastic screen protector, translucent plastic case, and SIM ejector tool in the box.

The phone uses stereo speakers, but the symmetrical stereo speakers used on Mi 10 have been changed to asymmetrical stereo speakers. The top sound unit is slightly smaller than the bottom, and also functions as an earpiece. In addition, the 3.5mm audio output and input interface that has been removed. The 3.5mm standard connector can only be converted using a USB Type-C to 3.5mm audio cable conversion cable.

The phone also supports Bluetooth 5.2, multi-function NFC, and infrared remote control functions. Remote control apps can be used to control electrical equipment that supports infrared control.

Software 
Xiaomi Mi 11 uses the MIUI 12 operating system based on Android 11, which can be upgraded to MIUI 13 based on Android 12 and subsequent versions through system updates.

Mi 11 Ultra / Mi 11 Pro / Mi 11 Lite 5G and Mi 11 Lite / Xiaomi 11 Lite 5G NE 
Along with the Mi 11, Xiaomi also released the Mi 11 Ultra and Mi 11 Pro in China on 29 March 2021 and globally in April 2021. Alongside those, Xiaomi also launched Mi 11 Lite 5G and Mi 11 Lite, and a Xiaomi 11 Lite 5G NE due to chip shortages.

Mi 11 Ultra and Mi 11 Pro are the higher flagship variants, which use Qualcomm Snapdragon 888 chipset and are the first devices to come with silicon-oxygen anode battery. The Mi 11 Lite uses Snapdragon 732G, Mi 11 Lite 5G with Snapdragon 780G, while Xiaomi 11 Lite 5G NE has Snapdragon 778G. All of these Lite phones are the thinnest smartphones of that year. Mi 11 Ultra also comes with a secondary display at the back.

References

External links 

 

Android (operating system) devices
Phablets
Mobile phones with multiple rear cameras
Mobile phones with 8K video recording
Mobile phones with infrared transmitter
Mobile phones introduced in 2021
Discontinued flagship smartphones
Xiaomi smartphones